Kalatrazan District is a district (bakhsh) in Sanandaj County, Kurdistan Province, Iran. At the 2006 census, its population was 22,890, in 5,555 families.  The District has one city: Shuyesheh. The District has three rural districts (dehestan): Kalatrazan Rural District, Negel Rural District, and Zhavarud-e Gharbi Rural District.

References 

Sanandaj County
Districts of Kurdistan Province